Son of Skip James is the thirtieth album by American singer/songwriter Dion. It was released on November 6, 2007 on the Verve Forecast Records label. The album stayed on the Billboard Blues Albums chart for twelve weeks, peaking at No. 4 on November 24, 2007.

The album serves as a follow-up to Dion's 2006 Grammy-nominated blues album, Bronx in Blue. The majority of tracks on Son of Skip James are cover versions of well-known blues songs, some of them classics. The album's title references blues legend Skip James, a friend of Dion's. Dion described the use of James's name for the album as "a kind of mission statement for the project".

Critical reception 

The album was generally positively received by critics, who called out its authenticity, simplicity, and emotional depth. The original tracks, particularly "The Thunderer", were considered to stand on equal or even superior footing to the cover tracks. Most critics agreed that Dion had effectively personalized the covers, although Tony Sclafani of PopMatters disagreed, calling the track selection "too familiar", and his recordings "too reverent" to bring the project fully to life.  Martin Halo of JamBase highlighted Dion's dedication to researching the origins of the cover songs as part of what made the album distinctive among other blues cover albums.

Joel Selvin of SFgate.com called it "another landmark in a career littered with them". Thom Jurek, writing for AllMusic, called it "one of the best records of the year". Chris Jones of BBC Music called it "every inch the equal of its predecessor". Nick Cristiano of The Philadelphia Inquirer found it "exceptionally warm and intuitive". Despite his criticism of the track selection, Sclafani said the album "does not fall short when it comes to ass-kicking". Halo felt that the album featured "master musicianship and stunning vocals", but called it "nothing we haven’t heard before."

Track listing 
Except where noted, credits are adapted from AllMusic.

Personnel 
Adapted from AllMusic.

Musicians 
 Bob Guertin – audio engineer, organ, percussion  
 Dion DiMucci – audio production, guitar, harmonica, producer, vocals 
 Rick Krive – piano

Additional personnel 
 Bill Bush – photography  
 Susan DiMucci – photography  
 Michael Friedman – photography  
 Richard Gottehrer – executive producer  
 Hollis King – art direction  
 Emily Lazar – mastering 
 Kazumi Matsumoto – graphic design

References 

2007 albums
Blues albums by American artists
Covers albums
Dion DiMucci albums
Verve Records albums